Goalissimo  is a television programme on Channel 4. An alternative to Football Italia and French Football, Goalissimo covered a lot of the world's football action. It was on late at night during the week, but was repeated at 7am on Saturdays. From November 2012 the show has begun a weekly run on Premier Sports, channel 428 on Sky in the UK.

Show 
The show covered action in the top leagues in England, France, Spain, Germany, Italy, Norway, Sweden, Portugal, Scotland, South America, Turkey and Africa. It also had the best action from the UEFA Champions League and the UEFA Cup. It also featured a gaffe of the week, such as miss, miskick or a goalkeeping error and a goal of the week which was usually introduced by Nick Halling as 'from the maligned to the sublime' or something along those lines. As Premier League and La Liga broadcasting rights are not owned by Channel 4, still images from the games that fade in and out with each other are used instead, with voice-over commentary and a bongo-drum based soundtrack.
But the program unfortunately ceased a few years ago.

Commentators and Reporters 
The programme was regularly narrated by Nick Halling, but Andy Ford, Simon Golding and John Roder had deputised. The commentators were Ross Dyer and Garry Barfoot, but Andy Ford had also commentated before. Since 2010 the show has been produced by Elliott Sweeney. The show is no longer broadcast on Channel 4 but is still shown around the globe.

External links
Sport - Goalissimo at Channel4.com

Channel 4 original programming